Ricardo Aldabe (born 7 March 1965) is a Spanish former swimmer who competed in the 1984 Summer Olympics. He is married to Kathrine Bomstad.

References

1965 births
Living people
Spanish male backstroke swimmers
Olympic swimmers of Spain
Swimmers at the 1984 Summer Olympics